is a Japanese footballer who plays as a left back for Sagan Tosu.

Career statistics

References

External links

2003 births
Living people
Japanese footballers
Japan youth international footballers
Association football defenders
Sagan Tosu players
J1 League players